Punwarka is a village situated in Saharanpur district in the Indian state of Uttar Pradesh. It is about 10 km from Saharanpur city. In 1961, it had a population of 1207. As of the 2011 census, it had 1260 households.

Educational institutes

University 

 Maa Shakumbhari University

References 

Villages in Saharanpur district